Kenji Takahashi may refer to:

, Japanese footballer
, Japanese footballer
, Japanese sailor
 Kenji Takahashi (racing driver), Japanese racing driver, twice winner of the 1000 km Suzuka
Kenji Takahashi a.k.a. Kenji Ohba, actor
, Japanese voice actor
, Japanese illustrator